Baron Glentanar, of Glen Tanar in the County of Aberdeen, was a title in the Peerage of the United Kingdom. The family owned the Glen Tanar Estate in Aberdeenshire., and also town houses in Edinburgh, and Aberdeen. The barony was created on 29 June 1916 for George Coats. The title became extinct on the death of his son, the second Baron, in 1971.

The first Baron was the younger brother of Sir Thomas Glen-Coats, 1st Baronet, and a first cousin of Sir James Coats, 1st Baronet (see Coats baronets). Thomas was director of Coats Group in 1918; and previously he served in World War I as lieutenant as part of the Black Watch Royal regiment of Scotland, and as a signal sergeant. He became a justice of the peace for Aberdeenshire.

Barons Glentanar (1916)
George Coats, 1st Baron Glentanar (1849–1918)
Thomas Coats, 2nd Baron Glentanar (1894–1971)

See also
Glen-Coats baronets
Coats baronets

References

Sources

Extinct baronies in the Peerage of the United Kingdom
Noble titles created in 1916